Joe Bowman may refer to:
Joe Bowman (baseball) (1910–1990), American baseball pitcher
Joe Bowman (footballer) (1902–1941), English footballer
Joe Bowman (marksman) (1925–2009), Houston bootmaker and marksman
Joseph Bowman (1752–1779), Virginia militia officer
 Joe Bowman, fictional character on the Australian soap opera Home and Away